Kottaiyur is a suburb of Karaikudi  located in northern part of Karaikudi town in Sivaganga district of the Indian state of Tamil Nadu. The village is famous for Kottaiyur Sivan Temple which is one of the master pieces in the Chettinadu region & old lime stone  heritage buildings which are the unique identity’s of chettinadu region & its  infrastructure. Kottaiyur is well developed & famous for its reputed educational institution in its surroundings. 
It’s Kottaiyur panchayat administration includes two more villages within it Velangudi &  Alagapuri .

Geography

Demographics
 Indian census, Kottaiyur had a population of 14766 of which 49% was male and 51% female. The literacy rate of 75% is higher than the national average of 59.5%. Among men, the literacy rate is 79%, compared to 71% among females. 10% of the population is under six years of age.

Education Institutions
Kottaiyur have well reputed schools and colleges around its town. Lot of students from near by surrounding villages and towns are studying here.
Following are notable institutions 
 Muthuiah Alagappa Matriculation Higher secondary School
 Chidambaram Chettiyar girls higher secondary school 
 Thanjavur Arunachalam Chettiyar Gov.hr.sec.school 
 Sanatana Dharma Vidyalaya Primary School 
 Kottaiyur Panchayat Union Middle School.  
 part of Alagappa university is within the administrative limit of Kottaiyur town panchayat such as Alagappa institute of Management, Alagappa institute of Physical Education, Alagappa Alumini Park & Ramanujan Centre for Higher Mathematics.

Alagappa University second entrance with memorial arch and Dr.Alagappa Chettiyar statue is located in Kottaiyur - Sri Ram Nagar Railway gate area.

Notable individuals

Dr. Alagappa Chettiar, philanthropist and founder of Alagappa University.
Roja Muthiah Chettiar
A. K. Chettiar

References

External links 
 Roja Muthiah in the University of Chicago Magazine

Cities and towns in Sivaganga district